Cirsium eatonii, commonly known as Eaton's thistle or mountaintop thistle, is a North American species of flowering plants in the family Asteraceae.

The species has been found in Idaho, Montana, New Mexico, Wyoming, Nevada, Utah and Colorado.

Description
Cirsium eatonii is highly variable.  It is an erect herb up to 150 cm (60 inches or 5 feet) tall in some populations. The entire foliage is more or less spiny. One plant produces several flower heads with pink to purple or yellow flowers. The species grows at high elevations in grasslands, sagebrush steppes, open savannahs, etc.

Varieties
A number of varieties have been identified, which include:
Cirsium eatonii var. clokeyi - Clokey thistle, Spring Mountains thistle, white-spine thistle. This variety is rare and uncommon. - Nevada
Cirsium eatonii var. eatonii - Nevada, Utah
Cirsium eatonii var. eriocephalum - alpine thistle, mountain thistle - Colorado, New Mexico, Utah
Cirsium eatonii var. hesperium  - tall mountain thistle - Colorado
Cirsium eatonii var. murdockii - northern mountain thistle - Colorado, Idaho, Montana, Nevada, Utah, Wyoming
Cirsium eatonii var. peckii - ghost thistle, Steens Mountain thistle  - Nevada, Oregon
Cirsium eatonii var. viperinum - Snake Range thistle - Nevada

References

External links
 
 
 
 

eatonii
Flora of the Western United States
Flora of the Great Basin
Plants described in 1871
Taxa named by Asa Gray
Flora without expected TNC conservation status